"Hate Our Love" is a song by American singer Queen Naija and American rapper and fellow Michigan recording artist Big Sean, from Queen's upcoming second studio album. It was released as the lead single from the album on February 4, 2022.

Background
On January 22, 2022, the song was announced on Queen's Instagram account along with the link to pre-save the single. On January 28, Queen revealed that the other recording artist on the song was American rapper Big Sean and that February 4 was the song's release date.

Charts

Release history

References

2022 singles
Big Sean songs
2022 songs
Songs written by Big Sean
Capitol Records singles